Shishgarh is a town and a nagar panchayat in Bareilly district in the Indian state of Uttar Pradesh.

Geography
It has an average elevation of 174 metres (570 feet).

Demographics
The Shishgarh Nagar Panchayat has population of 25,815 of which 13,468 are males while 12,347 are females as per report released by Census India 2011.

Population of Children with age of 0-6 is 4345 which is 16.83% of total population of Shishgarh (NP). In Shishgarh Nagar Panchayat, Female Sex Ratio is of 917 against state average of 912. Moreover Child Sex Ratio in Shishgarh is around 912 compared to Uttar Pradesh state average of 902. Literacy rate of Shishgarh city is 37.36% lower than state average of 67.68%. In Shishgarh, Male literacy is around 48.61% while female literacy rate is 25.10%.

References

Cities and towns in Bareilly district